The anterior compartment of the leg is a fascial compartment of the lower leg. It contains muscles that produce dorsiflexion and participate in inversion and eversion of the foot, as well as vascular and nervous elements, including the anterior tibial artery and veins and the deep fibular nerve.

Muscles
The muscles of the compartment are:

 tibialis anterior
 extensor hallucis longus
 extensor digitorum longus
 fibularis (peroneus) tertius

Function
The compartment contains muscles that are dorsiflexors and participate in inversion and eversion of the foot.

Innervation and blood supply
The anterior compartment of the leg is supplied by the deep fibular nerve (deep peroneal nerve), a branch of the common fibular nerve. The nerve contains axons from the L4, L5, and S1 spinal nerves.

Blood for the compartment is supplied by the anterior tibial artery, which runs between the tibialis anterior and extensor digitorum longus muscles. When the artery crosses the extensor retinaculum, it changes its name to dorsalis pedis artery.

Additional images

Notes and references

See also

Fascial compartments of leg
Crural fascia

Lower limb anatomy